Ulur West is a village in the Orathanadu taluk of Thanjavur district, Tamil Nadu, India.

Demographics 

As per the 2001 census, Ulur West had a total population of 4209 with 2059 males and 2150 females. The sex ratio was 1044. The literacy rate was 68.5.

References 

 

Villages in Thanjavur district